National Science Library may refer to:
Canada Institute for Scientific and Technical Information (CISTI), Ottawa, Canada
Institut de l'information scientifique et technique, Vandœuvre-lès-Nancy, France
German National Library of Science and Technology, Hanover, Germany
National Science Library & Resource Centre 
National Science Library (Georgia)
National Science Digital Library, United States
National Science Library (India)
National Science Library (Bangladesh)

See also
List of libraries
National library